The proto-mitochondrion is the hypothetical ancestral bacterial endosymbiont from which all mitochondria in eukaryotes are thought to descend, after an episode of symbiogenesis which created the aerobic eukaryotes.

Phylogeny

The phylogenetic analyses of the few genes that are still encoded in the genomes of modern mitochondria suggest an alphaproteobacterial origin for this endosymbiont, in an ancient episode of symbiogenesis early in the history of the eukaryotes. Although the order Rickettsiales has been proposed as the alphaproteobacterial sister-group of mitochondria, there is no definitive evidence as to which alphaproteobacterial group the proto-mitochondrion emerged from.  Martijn et al found mitochondria are a possible sister-group to all other alphaproteobacteria. The phylogenetic tree of the Rickettsidae has been inferred by Ferla et al. from the comparison of 16S + 23S ribosomal RNA sequences.

Metabolism
Toni Gabaldón and Martijn Huynen (2003) reconstructed the proteome (the entire set of proteins expressed by a genome) and corresponding metabolism of the proto-mitochondrion by comparing extant alpha-proteobacterial and eukaryotic genomes. They concluded that this organism was an aerobic alpha-proteobacterium respiring lipids, glycerol and other compounds provided by the host. At least 630 gene families derived from this organism can still be found in the 9 eukaryotic genomes analyzed in the study.

See also

 Abiogenesis
 Endosymbiotic theory
 Hydrogenosome
 Midichloria
 Protocell
 Rickettsiales

References

Mitochondria
Pseudomonadota
Symbiosis